Mortimer Chauncey "Morty" Smith, Sr. is one of the eponymous characters from the American animated television series Rick and Morty. Created by Justin Roiland and Dan Harmon, and voiced by the former for the first six seasons of the series, Morty is a 14-year-old boy loosely inspired by Michael J. Fox's Marty McFly from Back to the Future. Known for his awkward, anxious, second-guessing, doubtful personality, and low sense of self-esteem; the character has been critically well-received. He is the good-natured and impressionable grandson of mad scientist Rick Sanchez, the son of Jerry and Beth Smith, the younger brother of Summer Smith, and the father of Morty Jr. and Naruto Smith, who can be easily manipulated. In September 2021, Jaeden Martell portrayed Morty in a series of promotional interstitials for the series.

Although initially referring to himself as "Morty C-137" in reference to the designation given to his grandfather by the Trans-Dimensional Council of Ricks, in reference to Rick's original universe, "C-137", in "Rickmurai Jack", Rick is revealed to not be Morty's original Rick, with Morty's true reality designation, Morty Prime, being revealed in the audio commentary for "Solaricks". Book 1 of the Oni Press Rick and Morty comic series (comprising the first two volumes of the series) follows the Rick and Morty of Dimension C-132 (until their deaths in the "Head-Space" arc) while most issues of subsequent installments follow the Rick (C-137) and Morty (Prime) of the television series; the video game Pocket Mortys follows the Rick and Morty of Dimension C-123, while various other Mortys are the focus of episodes set in the inter-dimensional Citadel of Ricks and Mortys, ruled by President Morty of Dimension C-594, who was colloquially known as "Evil Morty" among fans and the media until the series' fifth season, where this name was briefly officially adopted, and whose origin story is explored in the limited series Pocket Like You Stole It. President Morty has received a positive critical reception, praised for his iconic mind control eyepatch and outwardly calm and understanding, yet inwardly cunning and ruthless demeanor.

Biography

Morty Smith Prime 
In the first season of the series, Morty is 14 years old and is a student at Harry Herpson High School along with his older sister Summer. Morty seems to be suffering from anxiety and is easily stressed, largely as a result of traumatic experiences during his adventures with Rick. He is often dismissed as idiotic by Rick and others but is shown to be wiser than his grandfather in terms of understanding people's feelings and is capable of explosive anger and moral outrage in objection to Rick's attitude and actions.

President Morty 
In the episode "Close Rick-counters of the Rick Kind", Eyepatch Morty is introduced alongside "Evil" Rick in the opening scene as he tranquilizes and captures another Morty while "Evil" Rick kills the other Rick. Later, Eyepatch Morty as "Evil" Rick greets Rick C-137 and his Morty as they arrive at their lair, with "Evil" Rick interrogating Rick C-137 while Eyepatch Morty silently puts Morty in a prison alongside the other Mortys they had captured, using their intelligence brainwaves as a way to conceal themselves from the Citadel, a society of Ricks and Mortys from other realities who rule the multiverse. After Morty convinces the other Mortys to overthrow "Evil" Rick, beating him to death before he can reveal to Rick why he had framed him for murder, Eyepatch Morty is among the Mortys relocated to the Citadel by the Council of Ricks. In the closing scene, a pair of Ricks discover "Evil" Rick to have a receiver implanted in his brain and have been controlled remotely; elsewhere, Eyepatch Morty removes his eyepatch, the transmitter, and crushes it under his foot, revealing him to have been the true mastermind controlling "Evil" Rick's thoughts and actions.
Following the decimation of the Citadel and death of the Council of Ricks at the hands of Rick C-137 in "The Rickshank Rickdemption", a Candidate Morty represents the Morty Party in the presidential election to elect the first President of the Citadel in "The Ricklantis Mixup". Although his Campaign Manager Morty doubts he has any chance at being elected, Candidate Morty becomes the front-runner after giving an inspiring speech, before firing Campaign Manager Morty for having doubted his abilities. The following day, Campaign Manager Morty shoots Candidate Morty after receiving secret documents from him from a trench coat-wearing Rick; before being executed the following night by being thrown out of an airlock for the attempt, Campaign Manager Morty learns not only that Candidate Morty has survived his assassination attempt, but that he has been elected President. After being threatened by the Shadow Council of Ricks who had truly run the previous Citadel, the newly dubbed President Morty has those who stand against him executed and their bodies were thrown out of the Citadel's airlocks. Outside, amongst the bodies of hundreds of other Ricks and Mortys, the secret documents that Campaign Manager Morty was given are revealed to confirm that Eyepatch Morty and President Morty are the same person.
"This seems like a good time for a drink, and a cold, calculated speech with sinister overtones. A speech about politics, about order, brotherhood, power... But speeches are for campaigning. Now... is the time for action."
President Morty returns in the season 5 finale "Rickmurai Jack". In the episode, it is revealed that—bitter about the continuous replacement and exploitation of versions of himself and disgusted by Rick's narcissism—President Morty seeks to break free of the Rick-centered, "Central Finite Curve" and into the wider multiverse where Ricks don't control the outcome of the Smith family (i.e. using certain techniques that lead to Jerry and Beth Smith having children), and aren't necessarily the smartest. "Every version of us has spent every version of all of our lives in one infinite crib, built around an infinite fucking baby. And I'm leaving it. That's what makes me "evil" - being sick of him." In order to do so, President Morty framed and then captured Rick C-137 in "Close Encounters of the Rick Kind" to scan his mind for the designs for the Citadel (as C-137 was the original architect) in order to use it to breach the curve. After capturing Rick and Morty and completing the scan of Rick's brain, President Morty initiated his plan, killing thousands of Ricks and Mortys and using their destroyed bodies to power the Citadel, transformed into a massive portal gun. Once escaping from and destroying the curve, President Morty uses his own portal gun to create a yellow portal and enter the wider multiverse. 

In a possible future in "Never Ricking Morty", President Morty is shown to be in command of several armies of alternate versions of Rick Sanchez and Mr. Meeseeks, alongside the Gazorpazorp species, Morty Smith Jr., and a Palpatine-dressed Mr. Poopybutthole, with Morty himself equipped with a robotic arm and trident while wearing a cape and his mind-control eyepatch. In the Rick and Morty anime short "Rick and Morty vs. Genocider", a spectacled President Morty and the Citadel send another Morty on a mission to Japan to track down Rick C-137 and prevent him from joining a renegade group of Ricks commanding "The Genocider". After Rick C-137 destroys The Genocider and is apparently himself killed, President Morty is revealed to have been in control of both The Genocider and the forces of the Citadel he sent alongside the other Morty, before ordering a memorial constructed for the fallen Ricks and disposing of his remote control for The Genocider. After then entering a hallway alone, he looks somberly into the distance. The character has had a different physical design in each of their appearances in the television series, while their cameo appearance in the Oni Press Rick and Morty comic series is based on their appearance in "The Ricklantis Mixup". The comic book limited series Pocket Like You Stole It provides a possible origin story for the character, as the "Evil Morty" of Dimension C-594 (formerly "Plain Ol' Morty"), who becomes "sick of" Ricks due to first witnessing the exploitation and mass cloning of other Mortys within the "Pocket Mortys" death game.

Development
The character was created by Justin Roiland and Dan Harmon, who first met at Channel 101 during the early 2000s. In 2006, Roiland created The Real Animated Adventures of Doc and Mharti, an animated short parodying the Back to the Future characters Doc Brown and Marty McFly, and the precursor to Rick and Morty. The idea for Rick and Morty, in the form of Doc and Mharti was brought up to Adult Swim, and the ideas for a family element and Rick being a grandfather to Morty were developed. The cliffhanger ending of the comic series arc "Rick Revenge Squad" references a future alliance between President Morty, Lucius Needful, Zeep Xanflorp, Supernova, Beta VII, Phoenixperson, and the rebuilt Galactic Federation in the television series.

Morty Smith appears in the couch gag of the 2015 The Simpsons episode "Mathlete's Feat", cloning a new Simpson family after accidentally killing the previous one.

Morty Smith cameos in the 2021 film Space Jam: A New Legacy, restraining the Tasmanian Devil before leaving him in the hands of LeBron James and the TuneSquad.

In September 2021, Jaeden Martell portrayed Morty Smith in a series of promotional interstitials, directed by Paul B. Cummings, alongside Christopher Lloyd as Rick Sanchez.

In the Fortnite Battle Royale Season 7 Battle Pass, Morty appears as a pickaxe that is modeled after an alternate version of him called "Hammerhead Morty" rather than being an actual outfit. In August 2021, he became available as an outfit, named "Mecha Morty".

Morty Smith appears in the 2022 Half in the Bag episode "Jayus Ex Mikeina" from Red Letter Media, with Roiland reprising his role, dubbing over Jay Bauman, who physically portrays Morty in the episode.

Reception
The character has received an overall positive reception. VerbStomp described Morty as "Perhaps the picture of childhood innocence, or perhaps the product of parental neglect. Morty is unintelligent, skittish [...] and distressed, likely due to his traumatic experiences while venturing into new worlds with Rick." The theme song of President Morty, "For the Damaged Coda" (2000) by indie rock band Blonde Redhead, gained renewed exposure for its use in the series, spawning several memes around the character and song.

Vulture praised "the blissed-out sexy indie [theme] music" of the alternate reality President Morty and their initially "adorable and non[-]threatening" appearance in "The Ricklantis Mixup", in addition to expressing interest in the various fan theories around the character. Screen Rant praised the character as "one of the most compelling villains the series could offer" despite their "brief and cryptic" appearances, in particular complimenting their Machiavellian character traits, while Flickering Myth praised the character as "a [big] fan favourite and easily the show’s most enigmatic character." Paste referred to "the mo[st] sobering aspect of [President] Morty’s return [a]s the realization that he’s…not so different from the Patrick Bate-Morty we met in "Rest and Ricklaxation" two weeks ago. Ruthless, confident, without a conscience and smarter than he gets credit for are all traits we’ve seen embodied in Morty’s ideal of himself, and they all exist in [President] Morty, who now seems like a possible culmination of the aforementioned long-term moral development (or atrophy) of the Morty we know. The Mary Sue praised the initial character concept as "generator of a million theories, wisely held back by the writers for moments of maximum punch", describing their reintroduction as "the perfect way to force the issue of our Morty’s increased instability and keep things from reverting to the status quo." before concluding that:
"[Justin] Roiland sells the gravitas and magnetism of Eyepatch Morty well—it’s easy to forget that this is a character we know very little about, beyond what could be extrapolated through the Rick he was controlling. Given the opportunity to start from not-quite-scratch, we’re presented with a character who is inscrutable on a larger scale but understandable in the moment. He’s a chameleon and, by his admission, a believer in action. It’s a fantastic setup, effectively deploying the return of the now infamous “For the Damaged [Coda]” backing track without feeling forced."
Since the release of "Close Rick-counters of the Rick Kind" in March 2014, President Morty has become one of the most popular characters in the overall Rick and Morty franchise, with several memes being made about him and "life's most dramatic twists and turns", in particular based around the "For the Damaged Coda" theme song.

Accolades and nominations

Family tree

References

Animated human characters
Male characters in animated series
Television characters introduced in 2013
Television characters introduced in 2014
Teenage characters in television
Fictional alcohol abusers
Fictional amputees
Fictional characters with post-traumatic stress disorder
Fictional dictators
Fictional Hispanic and Latino American people
Fictional characters from Washington (state)
Fictional kings
Fictional murderers of children
Fictional nihilists
Fictional politicians
Fictional presidents
Fictional revolutionaries
Fictional torturers
Fighting game characters
Rick and Morty characters
Child characters in animated television series
Animated characters introduced in 2013